Pleszew is a town in central Poland, in Greater Poland Voivodeship, about 90 km southeast of Poznań. It is the capital of Pleszew County (powiat pleszewski). Population is 17,892 (2004).

History

The oldest permanent human settlements in the present-day Pleszew and its surroundings date back to the 9th century BC. The oldest known mention of Pleszew, already as a town, comes from a 1283 document of - in the document of Duke and future King of Poland Przemysł II of the Piast dynasty. In the following centuries it was a private town owned by Polish nobility, located in the Kalisz Voivodeship in the Greater Poland Province of the Polish Crown. King John I Albert in the privilege of 1493 permitted the organization of two weekly markets and two annual fairs. In the early 16th century, there were nine craft guilds in the town. Pleszew was a local center of Reformation. In the 18th century, one of two main routes connecting Warsaw and Dresden ran through Pleszew and Kings Augustus II the Strong and Augustus III of Poland traveled that route numerous times.

During the Second Partition of Poland, in 1793, Pleszew was annexed by Prussia. It was regained by Poles as part of the short-lived Duchy of Warsaw in 1807, before it was re-annexed by Prussia in 1815. It was an important center of the unsuccessful Polish Greater Poland uprising (1848). In the following decades, to resist Germanisation, Poles founded various organizations, including agricultural, industrial and educational societies, the Cooperative Bank (Bank Spółdzielczy), a printing house, scout troops and a local branch of the "Sokół" Polish Gymnastic Society. In the second half of the 19th century, new industrial factories were established.

In October 1918, a few weeks before Poland regained independence, local Poles began preparations for an uprising, which aim was to reintegrate the town along with the region of Greater Poland with soon to be reborn Poland. Many inhabitants took part in the Greater Poland uprising (1918–19), and seven inhabitants were also killed in the Polish–Soviet War in 1919-1920. The Poles took control of the town in January 1919. Within the interwar Second Polish Republic the local insurgent unit was transformed into a full-fledged infantry regiment of the Polish Army.

On the day of the German invasion of Poland (World War II), on September 1, 1939, Germany unsuccessfully air raided Polish military barracks, killing 13 civilians instead. Wehrmacht troops entered the town a week later. During the German occupation of Poland, the Polish population was subject to mass arrests, executions and expulsions. Shortly after capturing the town, the Germans established a prison for Polish people in the town. On September 28, 1939, the Germans looted the local museum. During the Intelligenzaktion, in October 1939, the Germans executed 7 Poles in the Boreczek forest. Another 68 Poles were killed in the prison, and 8 Poles were murdered at the Gestapo station. Nevertheless, the Polish resistance movement in Pleszew was organized already in October 1939. In 1940, the Germans expelled 155 Poles, mostly owners of shops and workshops with entire families, and their enterprises were then handed over to German colonists as part of the Lebensraum policy. Poles expelled from other villages in the region were sent as slave labour to new German colonists in the town's vicinity, and there was also a forced labour camp in the town in 1944–1945. The Germans also destroyed the gravestone of Polish insurgents fallen in 1919. The town was captured by the Soviets in January 1945, and was soon restored to Poland. The devastated gravestone of Polish insurgents was rebuilt in 1947.

In 1983 the 700th anniversary of Pleszew was celebrated, in reference to the first known historical mention of the town in 1283.

Sights
There also numerous memorials at the sites of killings of Poles carried out by the Germans during the occupation of Poland.

Notable people 

 Agnieszka (Lipska) Baranowska (1819–1890), Polish playwright and poet, wrote several plays for this town's local theater
 Moses Samuel Zuckermandl (1836–1917), Czech-German rabbi, lived here
 Stefan Pawlicki (1839–1916), Polish Catholic priest, philosopher, historian of philosophy; lived here
 Teodor Jeske-Choiński (1854–1920), Polish intellectual, writer and historian, literature critic
 Hugo Leichtentritt (1874–1951), German-Jewish musicologist and composer, born here
 Emil Jarrow (Javorzynski) (1876–1959), world touring vaudeville magician and comedian, born here
 Hanna Suchocka (born 1946), first female Prime Minister of Poland, born here
 Sergiusz Prusak (born 1979), Polish footballer, born here
 Maciej Piaszczyński (born 1989), Polish international speedway rider, born here

International relations

Twin towns — Sister cities
Pleszew is twinned with:
 Morlanwelz
 Spangenberg (1997)
 Saint-Pierre-d'Oléron

See also 
 Gmina Pleszew
 Pleszew County
 Kreis Pleschen, Posen
 Pleszówka

References

External links 
 Official town webpage

Pleszew County
Cities and towns in Greater Poland Voivodeship
Poznań Voivodeship (1921–1939)